Blakedown railway station serves the English village of Blakedown, Worcestershire. It was opened (as Churchill station) in 1852, later becoming known for a time as Churchill & Blakedown after the two villages became a single parish.

The station is unstaffed, with only a basic shelter on each platform. There is a level crossing immediately to the west of the platforms, and in the absence of a footbridge or subway this is also the only method for passengers to cross the tracks.

The platforms were lengthened in the 1990s to allow longer trains to call (see image - the hollow space and the white fence mark the extension). This is because Blakedown is within the Birmingham commuter band and over the twenty years between 1998 - 2018 usage of the station has increased by 147%. Currently there is a proposal to develop a car park on an adjacent field site to cater for further anticipated growth.

Since August 2012 the signalling system has been altered, with the former signal box having been closed and control of the nearby crossing and signals transferred to the West Midlands SCC at Saltley. The old signal box was then acquired by the Churchill and Blakedown Historical Society for their headquarters and was shifted across the road to a site adjoining the station in 2016.

Services
One Chiltern Railways Kidderminster-London service per weekday calls at Blakedown, at 08:13, as of the 2017 timetable.

Through services are available to both Worcester stations at peak periods. There is a two-hourly service from the station each way on Sundays, with through trains to and from Worcester.

References

Further reading

External links

Rail Around Birmingham and the West Midlands: Blakedown station

Railway stations in Worcestershire
DfT Category F1 stations
Former Great Western Railway stations
Railway stations in Great Britain opened in 1852
Railway stations served by Chiltern Railways
Railway stations served by West Midlands Trains
1852 establishments in England